Pedro Castro may refer to:

 Pedro Castro Nero (1541–1611), Spanish archbishop
 Pedro de Castro, 1st Duke of la Conquista (1678–1741), Spanish military officer and Viceroy of New Spain
 Pedro Ignacio de Castro Barros (1777–1849), Argentine statesman and priest
 Pedro Adolfo de Castro (1895–1936), Puerto Rican architect
 Pedro Castro (footballer, born 1947), Venezuelan football defender
 Pedro Castro (racquetball) (born 1991), Canadian racquetball player
 Pedro Castro (footballer, born 1993), Brazilian football midfielder

See also
 Pedro Fernández de Castro (disambiguation)